James Darryl Peacock MBE, (born 14 December 1977) is a motivational speaker, leadership mentor and former English professional rugby league footballer. He played for Leeds Rhinos and the Bradford Bulls in the Super League, and captained both Great Britain and England at international level. After retiring at the end of the 2015 season he became director of rugby at the Hull Kingston Rovers, but resumed his playing career towards the end of the 2016 season. He is the most successful player in Super League history, having won a total of 9 Super League championships, 4 Challenge Cup winners medals, 4 World Club Challenge winners medals, twice named the Best Forward in the World, named in the Super League Dream Team on 11 occasions, won the Man of Steel award in 2003 and in 2021 awarded the MBE.

Background
Born in Leeds, Peacock is a product of Bradford Bulls' junior programme, having played as a junior for Stanningley RLFC. On his way to becoming a first team regular for Bradford, Jamie spent a month on loan at Featherstone Rovers making four appearances and scoring one try. He also enjoyed a spell at University of Wollongong in Australia as he learned his rugby trade.

Professional playing career

Bradford
He made his Super League début in 1999 for Bradford, making two starts and 16 substitute appearances for the club, scoring six tries. However, it was the following year that he really cemented his place in the side, helping Bradford to Rugby League Challenge Cup success over Leeds at Murrayfield. During his time with Bradford he won every honour available, with Grand Final, Challenge Cup and World Club Challenge honours to his credit with Peacock recognised as being one of the key ingredients of this success. He gained a reputation in the world rugby, winning such accolades as Man of Steel, Players' Player of the Year and Rugby League Writers' Player of the Year.

Peacock earned himself a place in John Kear's England side for the 2000 World Cup. He made four appearances in the World Cup that year, scoring an impressive six tries which including a hat trick against Fiji at Headingley. Peacock played for England in 2001 against Wales. Also in 2001, he capped the season by making his Great Britain début against Australia scoring a try after just 86 seconds of his début in the first test victory at Huddersfield. He then become a permanent presence in the Great Britain squad making 14 appearances, all but three of which have been in the starting line up. Peacock won caps for Great Britain while at Bradford Bulls in 2001 against Australia (2 matches), and Australia (sub), in 2002 against Australia, New Zealand, and New Zealand (sub) (2 matches), in 2003 against Australia (3 matches), in 2004 against Australia (3 matches), and New Zealand, in 2005 against Australia (2 matches), and New Zealand (2 matches).

As Super League VI champions, the Bulls played against 2001 NRL Premiers, the Newcastle Knights in the 2002 World Club Challenge. He made 30 appearances as Bradford again returned to Old Trafford for the 2002 Super League Grand Final only to lose out to a Sean Long drop goal. However, Bradford were unstoppable as they captured the Challenge Cup, League Leaders and Grand Final trophies ahead of Leeds and Wigan respectively and Peacock was named Players Player of the Year, Rugby League Writers Player of the Year and Man of Steel.

Having won Super League VIII, Bradford played against 2003 NRL Premiers, the Penrith Panthers in the 2004 World Club Challenge. Bradford then battled all the way with Leeds to the 2004 Super League Grand Final where Leeds finally got the advantage over their old nemesis. Peacock was then selected in the Great Britain team to compete in the end of season 2004 Rugby League Tri-Nations tournament.

Leeds

Peacock was made captain of Great Britain for the 2005 and 2006 Gillette Tri-Nations tournaments due to injuries to Paul Sculthorpe. 
Leeds born Peacock joined the club he supported as a boy in 2006 from local rivals Bradford. He made his Leeds début against Huddersfield on the opening day of the season.

Peacock played for Great Britain while at Leeds in 2006 against New Zealand (3 matches), and Australia (2 matches), in 2007 against New Zealand (3 matches).
He played in the 2008 Super League Grand Final victory over St. Helens. and was also part of the 2007, 2009, 2011 and 2012 Super League Grand Final squads and team that won the World Club Challenge against Manly Sea Eagles.

He played for England in 2008 against France. On 16 June 2008, Peacock was announced as the England captain for the 2008 Rugby League World Cup in Australia. He played against Papua New Guinea, Australia, and New Zealand (2 matches), in 2009 against France (2 matches), New Zealand and Australia.

Peacock played a starring role in Leeds' 33-6 Grand Final victory over then reigning champions' St Helens. He played a full 80 minutes to win his 4th Super League champions ring.

He was named in the Super League Dream Team for both the 2008's Super League XIII & 2009's Super League XIV season.

He played in the 2009 Super League Grand Final victory over St. Helens at Old Trafford.

He was selected to play for England against France in the one-off test in 2010.
Peacock signed a new one-year deal at Leeds in July 2011.

He played in the 2011 Super League Grand Final victory over St. Helens at Old Trafford.

Peacock was appointed Member of the Order of the British Empire (MBE) in the 2012 New Year Honours for services to rugby league. On 26 June 2012, Peacock announced his retirement from international rugby league.

He played in the 2012 Challenge Cup Final defeat by the Warrington Wolves at Wembley Stadium.

He played in the 2012 Super League Grand Final victory over the Warrington Wolves at Old Trafford.

He enjoyed a resurgence the following season, and was once again named in the Super League Dream Team in 2013, 2014 & 2015.

Peacock played in the 2014 Challenge Cup Final victory over the Castleford Tigers at Wembley Stadium.

He played in the 2015 Challenge Cup Final victory over Hull Kingston Rovers at Wembley Stadium.

Peacock announced that he would retire from the sport upon the conclusion of the 2015 season and take up the role of football manager at Hull Kingston Rovers.

He played in the 2015 Super League Grand Final victory over the Wigan Warriors at Old Trafford.

Hull Kingston Rovers
Peacock joined Hull KR as football manager for the 2016 Super League season.  At the end of the regular season Hull KR finished 11th in the league and were forced to play in the 2016 Qualifiers.  After four of the eight games with the team lying fourth in the qualifying table (only the top three are guaranteed Super League status for 2017, fourth play fifth for the last Super League spot) and with the squad depleted by injuries Peacock announced he was coming out of retirement to play in the last games of the season.  He continued with his regular duties alongside playing.

Honours

Club
Bradford
Super League (3): 2001, 2003, 2005
Challenge Cup (2): 2000, 2003
World Club Challenge (2): 2002, 2004
 League Leaders' Shield (3): 1999, 2001, 2003
Leeds
 Super League (6): 2007, 2008, 2009, 2011, 2012, 2015
Challenge Cup (2): 2014, 2015
World Club Challenge (2): 2008, 2012
 League Leaders' Shield (2): 2009, 2015

Individual
Man of Steel Award: 2003

Orders and special awards
Member of the Order of the British Empire (MBE): 2012

Career stats

Post-rugby career

Motivational speaking
Jamie has transferred his experience captaining both Great Britain and England toward becoming a motivational speaker, whilst also focussing on leadership mentoring and promoting wellbeing for an increasing number of blue chip businesses, educational organisations and SME’s.
In addition to keynote speeches for business, he has developed the hugely successful ‘Building Champions’ mentoring programme to support personal development, leadership learning and culture change within organisations. Since its inception in 2016 over 1000 delegates have completed the 50 day program.

He has also researched, designed and created the ‘Be A Champion’ 30-day wellbeing programme, that is proven to create positive change through an improved mindset, good sleep, healthy eating and increased physical activity. The Be A Champion program’s simple and effective ability to build robust wellbeing habits means that tens of thousands of programs have been completed.

Author
Jamie Peacock released his autobiography ‘No White Flag’ in 2008, co-written with Phil Caplan. He has also written an accompanying book to his ‘Be A Champion’ wellbeing programme.

Media
Since retiring from the field, Jamie Peacock continues to contribute to the rugby league world through regular media appearances where he provides his expert insight and opinion.

References

External links
Jamie Peacock's Official Website
(archived by web.archive.org) Leeds Rhinos profile
(archived by web.archive.org) 2001 Ashes profile

1977 births
Living people
Bradford Bulls captains
Bradford Bulls players
England national rugby league team captains
England national rugby league team players
English rugby league players
Featherstone Rovers players
Great Britain national rugby league team captains
Great Britain national rugby league team players
Hull Kingston Rovers players
Leeds Rhinos captains
Leeds Rhinos players
Members of the Order of the British Empire
Rugby league players from Bramley
Rugby league props
Rugby league second-rows
University of Wollongong alumni
Yorkshire rugby league team players